A Shulamite (or Shulammite) is a person from Shulem. The Hebrew Bible identifies as a Shulamite the swarthy, female historical figure in the Song of Songs (in the King James Version and in other Bibles called the Song of Solomon or the Canticle of Canticles).

Background
She is most likely called the Shulammite because she came from an unidentified place called Shulem. Many scholars consider Shulammite to be synonymous with Shunammite (“person from Shunem”). Shunem was a village in the territory of Issachar, north of Jezreel and south of Mount Gilboa. Other scholars link Shulem with Salem, believing Solomon's bride was from Jerusalem. Still others believe that the title Shulammite (“peaceful”) is simply the bride's married name, being the feminine form of Solomon (“peaceful”) and only used after her marriage to the king.

Solomon uses passionate language to describe his bride and their love (Song 4:1–15). Solomon clearly loved the Shulammite—and he admired her character as well as her beauty (Song 6:9). Everything about the Song of Solomon portrays the fact that this bride and groom were passionately in love and that there was mutual respect and friendship, as well (Song 8:6–7).

Shulamite in culture

Art

Fictional entities
Shunammite is a fictional character in Gilead, in Margaret Atwood's sequel to The Handmaid's Tale, titled The Testaments (2019).

See also
Shunamitism

Song of Songs
Women in the Hebrew Bible
Unnamed people of the Bible